Shahid Sayyad Shirazi Metro Station, also referred  to as Sayyad is a station in line 3 of the Tehran Metro.  It is located at an exit from Sayyad Expressway to Masil Bakhtar Avenue, in Tehran's district 7.

References

Tehran Metro stations
Railway stations opened in 2016
2016 establishments in Iran